Glenesk is a suburb of Johannesburg, South Africa, and is located in Region F of the City of Johannesburg Metropolitan Municipality. The suburb lies just north of Turffontein and is south of the CBD.

History
The suburb was surveyed in 1928 and then proclaimed on 30 September 1931. The name has a Scottish origin, named after Glenesk House in Scotland.

References

Johannesburg Region F